The Italiotes were the pre-Roman Greek-speaking inhabitants of the Italian Peninsula, between Naples and Sicily.

Greek colonization of the coastal areas of southern Italy and Sicily started in the 8th century BC and, by the time of the Roman ascendance, the area was so extensively hellenized that Romans called it Magna Graecia, that is "Greater Greece".

The Latin alphabet is a derivative of the Western Greek alphabet used by these settlers, and was picked up and adopted and modified first by the Etruscans and then by the Romans.

Italiote League
Tarentum controlled the Italiote League from about the end of the 5th century BC and levied troops from the Greek cities. Dionysius I of Syracuse conquered southern Italy (Magna Graecia), crushing the Italiote (Greek) League at the Battle of the Elleporus and destroying Rhegium.

See also
 Ancient peoples of Italy
 Battle of Pandosia
 Greek coinage of Italy and Sicily
 Italiot Greek: modern dialects
 Magna Graecia
 Milo of Croton
 Phlyax play
 Siceliotes
 Sicels

Notes

References
 A history of earliest Italy By Massimo Pallottino, 15 April 1991, Page 118 
 The Cambridge ancient history By John Boardman Page 709 
 Rome and the Western Greeks, 350 BC-AD 200 Page 103 
 Gender and ethnicity in ancient Italy By Tim Cornell, Kathryn Lomas Page 40  
 Calabria, the first Italy By Gertrude Elizabeth Taylor Slaughter Page 107